Swissport International Ltd. is a Swiss aviation services company providing airport ground, lounge hospitality and cargo handling services. Its headquarters are located in Opfikon, Canton of Zürich, Switzerland.

It handles around 282 million passengers and 4.8 million tonnes of cargo annually, on behalf of 850 companies in the aviation sector. With a workforce of around 66,000 personnel, Swissport is active at 307 locations in 50 countries, and generates consolidated operating revenue of EUR 2.8 billion.

History

The company was founded in 1996 as Swissair Ground Services International, independent of the former Swissair. In the following years, the company expanded both through organic growth and through various acquisitions. As part of the Swissair financial crisis, Swissport was first purchased by the British private equity firm Candover Investments and later sold in August 2005 to the Spanish construction company Ferrovial. In the meantime, the company had grown through various acquisitions. At the end of 2010, Ferrovial sold Swissport for €654 million to the French private equity firm PAI Partners.

In August 2013, Swissport announced the acquisition of competitor Servisair which bought Handlex in Canada, a part of the group Transat in 2012. In December 2013, the acquisition was approved, subject to conditions by the European Commission.

Over the years, Swissport has been the recipient of several industry awards including Ground Handling Award 2013, Air Cargo Handling Agent of the Year 2014 (for the sixth year in succession) and Global Aviation Ground Services Company 2012 (for the twelfth year in succession).

On July 31, 2015, China's HNA Group, the parent company of Hainan Airlines, announced that it would purchase Swissport for $2.81 billion US. “The acquisition by HNA will enable the company to grow in the interpenetrated Asian markets and in China, in particular, thanks to HNA’s strong roots in the region,” Ricardo de Serdio, a partner at PAI Partners, said in a news release.

On March 7, 2018, Swissport concluded the acquisition of Aerocare and its subsidiaries Skycare, Carbridge and EasyCart from Archer Capital and the Aerocare management. Swissport now holds 100% of Aerocare, an Aviation Services and Airport Infrastructure Services provider in Australia/New Zealand.

On June 8, 2020, Swissport's Belgian subsidiary declared bankruptcy, which was confirmed by the Belgian commercial courts the following day.

On June 25, 2020, Swissport UK & Ireland announced a 50% reduction in its workforce of 8,500.

In December 2020, Swissport had completed its comprehensive financial restructuring that began in August 2020. Ownership of the company has been transferred from the HNA Group to a group of financial investors led by the former senior secured lenders of Swissport. Their total existing debt was reduced by about 1.9 billion euros.

Lounge hospitality 
Swissport provides a lounge service called Aspire Lounge, which has the biggest lounge network in UK (21 lounges) with more lounges across the globe.

They also offer the AspirePlus lounge, which is an adult only lounge.

Aspire Lounge provides lounge services for financial institutions, tour operators and airlines.

Airlines - Aegean Airlines, Aeroflot, Aer Lingus, Air France, Asiana Airlines, Beijing Capital Airlines, Brussels Airlines , Czech Airlines, Eastern Airways, El Al, Emirates, Finnair, Iberia Express, Icelandair, Iran Air, KLM, Lufthansa, Philippine Airlines, PIA, Swiss International, Turkish Airlines, Vueling, Wideroe. 

Partner Frequent Flyer Scheme Lounge Access - Miles & More Scheme, One World Scheme, SkyTeam.

References

External links

HNA Group
Aircraft ground handling companies
Foodservice companies
Swissair
Opfikon
Food and drink companies of Switzerland
Transport companies established in 1996
Food and drink companies established in 1996
1996 establishments in Switzerland
2015 mergers and acquisitions
Companies based in the canton of Zürich